An Apology for Mohammed and the Koran is a 1869 book by John Davenport in which the author provides an account of his encounter with Islam.

Reception
It has been translated into Arabic, Persian and Urdu. The Persian translation of the book won the Iranian Royal Book of the Year.

Ali Khamenei appreciates the book and says: "Davenport was non-Muslim but since he was a man of knowledge and understanding, when he looks at the truths of Quran and the stronghold of the verses of this book, he understands that these truths are not from the limited human mind and are hence undeniable."

References

External links 
 An Apology for Mohammed and the Koran

1869 non-fiction books
English-language books
Books about Islam